Russell Lee Campbell (born April 2, 1969) is a former American football tight end who played one season with the Pittsburgh Steelers of the National Football League (NFL). He was drafted by the Pittsburgh Steelers in the seventh round of the 1992 NFL Draft. He played college football at Kansas State University and attended Wichita North High School in Wichita, Kansas.

References

External links
Just Sports stats
College stats

Living people
1969 births
Players of American football from Columbus, Ohio
American football tight ends
African-American players of American football
Kansas State Wildcats football players
Pittsburgh Steelers players
21st-century African-American people
20th-century African-American sportspeople